Amphoraceras is a monotypic moth genus of the family Noctuidae. Its only species, Amphoraceras rothschildi, is found on New Guinea. Both the genus and the species were first described by George Thomas Bethune-Baker in 1904.

References

Catocalinae
Noctuoidea genera
Monotypic moth genera